The N368 is a provincial road in the province of Groningen in the Netherlands. It runs from Blijham in the municipality of Westerwolde to Vlagtwedde in the same municipality.

Route description 
It starts in Blijham in the municipality of Westerwolde, it runs south via Wedde in the same municipality, and ends in Vlagtwedde also in the same municipality.

Junction and exit list

References 

368
Westerwolde (municipality)